Hinebaugh Creek (Latitude: 38.35; Longitude:-122.73)  is a westward-flowing stream in western Sonoma County within the Laguna de Santa Rosa watershed. As this watercourse proceeds westerly through the city of Rohnert Park, it has largely been channelized and courses in an artificially straight alignment. Considered waters of the United States as a jurisdictional matter, Hinebaugh Creek is potential habitat for the California red-legged frog and the Western pond turtle.  The dominant riparian vegetation is Himalayan blackberry and willow.

See also
Copeland Creek
Crane Creek 
Fairfield Osborn Preserve
Five Creek
List of watercourses in the San Francisco Bay Area

References

Rivers of Sonoma County, California
Sonoma Mountains
Tributaries of the Russian River (California)
Rohnert Park, California
Rivers of Northern California